James Benjamin "Ben" Stewart (born March 19, 1978) is a Canadian 16-time World Karate and Kick Boxing Champion, author, entrepreneur and motivational speaker. He has won nine W.K.A. super heavyweight titles, three W.A.K.O. titles, and four World Kickboxing Union titles. He founded Canadian Property Stars in 1996 and in 2008 wrote Millionaire in 90 Days: Working out at the Gym.

Biography

Early life
Stewart was born and raised in Ottawa, Ontario, and attended Katimavik Elementary School. By the age of 11 he held a number of jobs while attending school full-time, foreshadowing his business success. He graduated from Earl of March Secondary School in 1997 and from the Entrepreneurship program at Algonquin College in 1999. 

Athletic at an early age, Stewart began training in martial arts at the age of 9. From 1987 to 1991 he trained in Jiu-Jitsu under Sensei Randy Cooligan. He then moved on to study American Sport Karate under Steve "Nasty" Anderson in 1995 and quickly earned his black belt. Stewart also played competitive soccer between the ages of 10 and 13, before taking on competitive baseball until the age of 17.

Martial arts career
In 1998 Stewart ranked third in the world in Karate and became a member of the WKA Canadian National Team. At various times a Member (1998, 2001-2003, 2005, 2008-2012); a Captain (2003, 2009-2012); and a Coach (2002-2013); he was also President of the National Team from 2009 to 2012. 

Stewart was a Member of the WAKO National Team for four years (2003, 2005, 2007, 2013), and served as President in 2013 of both the WKU and WTKA/WKA Canadian National Teams. As well as competing, Stewart has also had significant success as a coach, having personally trained and coached over 20 youth and adult students to world titles in the WKA/WKU between 2002 and 2019.

In the fall of 2015, Stewart's competitive career was abruptly cut short when he underwent a surgical replacement of his left hip. Doctors told him that he would never enter the ring again. Undeterred, he conditioned and rehabilitated himself through hot yoga, and came back from retirement to fight in the world championship at the age of 40. In Athens, Greece, in 2018 he reclaimed his super-heavyweight World Title, and successfully defended that title the following year in Bregenz, Austria.

He is currently training to compete in the 2021 world competition in Québec City, Canada.

Corporate career
At the age of 18 Stewart created a landscaping business, which has grown into Canadian Property Stars, a full-service property maintenance company with offices across Canada and the United States. Stewart’s success with Canadian Property Stars is attributed to the fact that this is a highly motivating door to door sales model.

In 2000, upon graduating from college, Stewart took ownership of Steve Anderson Karate and Kick Boxing, a facility in the Ottawa area, which he owned until 2007. He was named Business Person of the Year in 2005 by the Kanata Chamber of Commerce — the same year he won the City of Ottawa's Athlete of the Year award in the martial arts category.

Author and Motivational Speaker
 
In 2008 Stewart published his first book, titled Millionaire in 90 Days: Working out at the Gym, to teach young adults strategies to increase their health and lifestyle, allowing them to become successful in all areas of their life.nah

Personal life
Stewart married Karen Hilberdink on November 22nd, 2009. They have three children together: Sidney, Saryna, and Sterling.

Championships and awards

References

External links
Ben Stewart Official site
Ben Stewart Interview on Hi Impact Media

1978 births
Living people
Canadian male kickboxers
Sportspeople from Ottawa